The Church of Scientology of France is organized as a group of secular nonprofit organizations. France is a secular state, which protects the rights of citizens to practice their religion. Although citizens can form religious associations based on the 1905 French law on the Separation of the Churches and the State, which grants certain benefits, the Church of Scientology of France is instead organized into secular associations based on a 1901 law regarding nonprofit groups.

A 1995 parliamentary report lists Scientology as a cult, and Scientology has since been under the watch of MIVILUDES and its predecessors (Observatoire interministériel sur les sectes and interministérielle de lutte contre les sectes). In its 2006 report MIVILUDES classified Scientology as a dangerous cult.

Seven officials from the Church of Scientology in France have been convicted of crimes such as embezzlement, and contribution to suicide.

History

Scientology was founded in 1952 by science fiction writer L. Ron Hubbard in the United States.  It subsequently spread to other countries.

Legal status

In 1978, L. Ron Hubbard was convicted in absentia by French authorities of engaging in fraud, fined 35,000 French Francs and sentenced to four years in prison. The head of the French Church of Scientology was convicted at the same trial and given a suspended one-year prison sentence.

Since 1995, some French authorities have classified the Church of Scientology as a "secte" (cult) as seen in the report of the National Assembly of France. On this basis, a hostile stance is generally taken against the organization. A 1999 government inquiry committee reporting on the financial aspect of cults recommended dissolving the Church of Scientology because of swindling, complicity of swindling, abuse of trust, and other nefarious activities. A government report in 2000 categorized the church as an "absolute cult" and recommended that all its activities be prohibited. The keeping of files containing personal information on all its members (and other practices), are seen to qualify the Church as a totalitarian cult, moreover "extremely dangerous". The report rejected U.S. criticism of the French government's hostility towards Scientology, saying that Washington's protection of cults was "exorbitant".

In 2005 the municipal government of Paris passed an official resolution so that unlike in Marseille, celebrity Scientologist Tom Cruise would never be made an honorary citizen, specifically because of his affiliation with Scientology.

The 2006 riots in France came in the midst of a parliamentary commission in charge of examining the influence of cults, particularly on youth, which started its hearings on July 12, 2006, and was scheduled to be completed in December that year. The government "cultic watchdog" agency MIVILUDES subsequently warned that cults were infiltrating the suburbs, increasingly offering aid as a cover for their activities, notably so in a Church of Scientology's communique that "appeared to be taking the credit for calming the situation in one of the riot-hit suburbs."

While he was Finance Minister, Nicolas Sarkozy received Tom Cruise in Paris in 2004. The anti-cult Roger Ikor centre's website wrote that President Sarkozy was preparing to change the 1905 French law on the Separation of the Churches and State (that had been forbidding the state to finance any cult or religion), to allow cults to receive money from the state. That modification did not take place.

Suicide of Patrice Vic
On November 22, 1996, the leader of the Lyon Church of Scientology, Jean-Jacques Mazier, was convicted of fraud and involuntary homicide and sentenced to eighteen months in prison for his role in the death of a member who committed suicide after going deeply into debt to pay for Scientology auditing sessions. Fourteen others were convicted of fraud as well.

Suicide of Kaja Ballo

Kaja Bordevich Ballo, a Norwegian student in Nice, committed suicide hours after hearing the results of a negative Scientology personality test.  In April 2008, Aftenposten noted that the French police were investigating connections between Scientology and Ballo's death. The investigation was being headed by a judge in France. Prosecutors stated in December 2008 that they could not determine a direct link between the Scientology personality test and Ballo's death. The family decided not to file a civil lawsuit, but the case received attention both in France, and in Norway where several family members were politicians, and where suicides are generally not discussed in mass media.

2008–09 cases

Early
On September 8, 2008, Judge Jean-Christophe Hullin ruled that Scientologists' Celebrity Center, bookstore, and seven Church leaders should be tried for fraud and "illegally practicing as pharmacists".  The ruling is in regards to a complaint made in 1998 by a woman who said she was enrolled into the Church of Scientology by a group she met outside a metro station.  The woman said she paid 140,000 francs for illegally prescribed drugs, an e-meter, and books. The trial was due to begin on 25 May 2009. It was believed that if the French Scientology organization lost the case, it could end up being dissolved. On 16 June 2009 current.com incorrectly reported that several of the church's leading members, including its leader Xavier Delamare, had been arrested and that the church had been banned from practicing in France. As it turned out, the website had actually been referencing an outdated BBC news article from November 1999. In September 2009 it was reported that the French Scientology organization was no longer at risk of dissolution as a result of the fraud trial, due to a very opportune and unexplained change in French legislation. That legislation change has since been reversed.

Conviction for fraud

Case
On 27 October 2009, the Church of Scientology was convicted of defrauding recruits out of their savings. One woman claimed she lost more than €20,000 in the 1990s. Judges ordered the Scientology Celebrity Center and bookshop to pay a €600,000 (US$888,000) fine; earlier plans by the prosecution to force the Church to disband completely could not proceed. The law supporting complete dissolution was temporarily inadmissible, due to a rework of the penal code. The dissolution law was not reinstated until after the case had begun, and therefore could not be used. Judges also stated that disbanding the church would push it underground, where it could not be monitored.  In his indictment, investigating judge Jean-Christophe Hullin criticized what he called the Scientologists' "obsession" with financial gain and practices he said were aimed at plunging members into a "state of subjection".

Seven leading Scientologists were fined, including the head of Scientology in France, Alain Rosenberg. Rosenberg received a two-year suspended jail sentence combined with a €30,000 fine. Four of the leaders received suspended sentences ranging from ten months to two years, while the other two were fined minor amounts. Agnès Bron, a church spokesperson, likened the fines to, "an Inquisition for modern times". According to Catherine Picard, head of the French Association of Victims of Cults, the fining might encourage more "unhappy Scientologist recruits" to bring out their concerns. She also stated that, "Scientology can no longer hide behind freedom of conscience."

Church public comments
The Scientology Celebrity Center spokesman, Éric Roux, stated that, "There is an attitude toward religious minorities in general ... that is pretty catastrophic". In relation to the government's official cult monitoring mission (agency) MIVILUDES, Roux claimed that "we have a government that pushes for hate against religious minorities". However, what he and others contested was "the fraud that is committed against families and individuals".

The Church of Scientology stated that they would appeal, with U.S. Church spokesman Tommy Davis claim the proceedings as being a "heresy trial" and claims that "the fines will get thrown out on appeal. We've had similar cases before and in other countries. If it has to go to the court of human rights we're confident we will win there". Davis claims that the proceedings were "in total violation of the European Convention on Human Rights and French constitutional guarantees on freedom". According to his view, "France is pretty much in the Dark Ages on the subject of religious tolerance ... We'll prevail as we have repeatedly in situations approximating this one".

Agnes Bron, a French official for the organisation, stated that "For each person who complains we have 100,000 ready to say nothing but good things about scientology." A  Rolling Stone article from 2009 reported that Scientology has about 100,000 to 200,000 adherents worldwide.

Future repercussions
Judges also said that they would ensure a paid posting would be placed in multiple publications outside France (including Time magazine and the International Herald Tribune) to ensure the news would spread beyond France; according to Olivier Morice, a lawyer for the civil plaintiffs, "The court told the Scientologists, in essence, to be very, very careful, because if you continue to use the same methods of harassment, you won't escape next time". Morice added that, "It’s the first time in France that the entity of the Church of Scientology is condemned for fraud as an organized gang". Georges Fenech, the head of MIVILUDES, said that the court "condemned [the French branch of Scientology] as an entity ... due to its fraudulent way of operating ... [If] they begin swindling again, they can be subject to dissolution in the future". Fenech added that, "[this] is a historical turning point for the fight against cult abuses", and that, while members are "allowed to continue their activity ... a seed has been planted".

In an interview on the Canadian Broadcasting Corporation current affairs radio program The Current with Hana Gartner, former high-ranking Scientology official Mark Rathbun commented that the decision to convict the Church of Scientology of fraud in France would not have a significant impact on the organization. "On the France thing I don't think that's going to have any lasting impact, simply because they got a nine hundred thousand dollar fine I think - which is like chump change to them. They've got literally nearly a billion dollars set aside in a war chest," said Rathbun.

As of 2009, members of the church are also being sued for fraud and practicing pharmacology without a license.

Adherents
The French government does not keep statistics on religion but in 1999 the Church itself claimed that it had 40,000 adherents in France. The French newspaper Le Figaro reckons around 5000 adherents in France in 2008.

In popular culture
The relationship between the Church of Scientology and the law in France is the subject of Is Scientology Above the Law? The documentary investigates the suspicious circumstances surrounding a fraud probe into sixteen members of the church of Scientology. The role of the church is questioned in connection with the disappearance of files critical to the case; lawyers for the prosecution argue that the missing evidence was deliberately taken by members of Scientology working within and effectively undermining the legal system to protect the reputation of the church.

See also
Scientology status by country
Notable Scientology court cases
Religion in France

References

External links

Church of Scientology International (French) 

France
Religion in France